United Nations Security Council Resolution 9, adopted on October 15, 1946, determined that a nation that was not a member of the International Court of Justice (ICJ) could voluntarily bring a case before the ICJ so long as that nation committed to abiding by the Court's ruling.  It was adopted unanimously by the Council.

See also
 List of United Nations Security Council Resolutions 1 to 100 (1946–1953)

References
Text of the Resolution at undocs.org

External links
 

 0009
 0009
October 1946 events